Lü Xiuzhi (born 26 October 1993 in Shexian, Anhui) is a Chinese female race walker specializing in 20 kilometers racewalking. Lü is two bronze medalist at the 2012 Summer Olympics and at the 2016 Summer Olympics she is also the silver medalist at the Beijing 2015 IAAF World Championships.

References

External links 
 
 
 

1993 births
Living people
Chinese female racewalkers
Asian Games gold medalists for China
Asian Games medalists in athletics (track and field)
Athletes (track and field) at the 2012 Summer Olympics
Athletes (track and field) at the 2014 Asian Games
Athletes (track and field) at the 2016 Summer Olympics
Athletes from Anhui
Medalists at the 2016 Summer Olympics
Olympic athletes of China
Olympic bronze medalists for China
Olympic bronze medalists in athletics (track and field)
People from Huangshan
World Athletics Championships athletes for China
World Athletics Championships medalists
Medalists at the 2014 Asian Games